Lewiston Dam may refer to:

Lewiston Dam (California), on the Trinity River
Lewiston Dam (Idaho), formerly on the South Fork Clearwater River